Food for Thought may refer to:

Music

Albums
 Food for Thought (Pink Cream 69 album)
 Food for Thought (Young Rome album)
 Food for Thought, a 1972 album by the band The J.B.'s
 Food for Thought, a 2004 album by the band Santana
 Food for Thought, a 2005 Iron Maiden tribute album
 Food for Thought/Take It Back, a 1990 album by American band Gray Matter

Songs
 "Food for Thought" (song), a 1980 song by UB40
 "Food for Thought", a 1983 song by 10cc
 "Food for Thought", the B side of the single 1969 "Many Rivers to Cross" by Jimmy Cliff

Television
 Food for Thought, a British documentary series presented by Brian J. Ford
 "Food for Thought", an episode of Alvin and the Chipmunks
 "Food for Thought", an episode of That's So Raven

Other uses
 Food for Thought (restaurant), a former vegetarian restaurant in London, England
 Food for Thought, a café within the Black Cat nightclub